WOGG (94.9 FM) is a radio station  broadcasting a country music format. Licensed to Oliver, Pennsylvania, United States.  The station is currently owned by FM Radio Licenses, LLC and simulcasts with sister stations WOGI and WOGH. WOGG is also one of the local primary’s for the Emergency Alert System for Fayette County, Pennsylvania, the other one being WPKL 99.3

History

The construction permit for this radio station was first issued June 16, 1988 to The Humes Broadcasting Corporation, licensee of the now-defunct WASP in Brownsville, Pennsylvania; about 12 miles north of Oliver.

The station was first issued the call letters WXAK on November 29, 1991, and on March 22, 1993, the station went on the air with the call letters WASP-FM, the call letters shared by its country and talk formatted AM sister.  WASP-FM went on the air with a country format, but with more current music and programmed entirely separate, with longtime Pittsburgh morning radio personality Jimmy Roach hosting the morning show, which he still does today.

Both stations operated out of their longtime studio location on Blaine Road (PA Route 88), just south of California until shortly after its sale to its present owner.  This location was also the transmitter location for WASP, but the transmitter site for WASP-FM was located further south in North Union Township, Fayette County, Pennsylvania.

In 1999, Humes Broadcasting sold WASP-AM-FM to its current owner, Keymarket Communications, and on January 1, 2000, the station switched calls to WOGG.

WOGG was partially simulcasted on WOGI in Moon Township, Pennsylvania for many years.  The two stations had separate morning shows but were simulated throughout the day.  In July 2020,  the stations combined into a full simulcast are known as Froggy 104.3 and Froggy 94.9.

Currently, the station’s weekday air staff consists of Mornings with Katiebugs from 5-10AM, Phil “The Kielbasa Kid” Kirzyc from sister station WPKL voice tracks Middays from 10AM-2PM, and Program Director Danger is on Afternoos 2-7PM.

References

External links

OGG
Country radio stations in the United States